The 1983 New York Jets season was the 24th season for the team and the 14th in the National Football League. It began with the team trying to improve upon its 6–3 record from 1982 and return to the playoffs under first-year head coach Joe Walton. The Jets, who finished the season with a record of 7–9, played their twentieth and final season at Shea Stadium before relocating their home games to Giants Stadium in East Rutherford, New Jersey, starting with the following season.

Roster

Regular season

Schedule

Standings

Game summaries

Week 4

Week 15 

Last home game played at Shea Stadium

References

External links 
 1983 statistics

New York Jets seasons
New York Jets
New York Jets|New York Jets season
1980s in Queens